Maurice Gerald Browne (28 September 1913 – 21 December 1980) was a New Zealand cricketer. He played in nine first-class matches for Wellington from 1937 to 1952.

See also
 List of Wellington representative cricketers

References

External links
 

1913 births
1980 deaths
New Zealand cricketers
Wellington cricketers
Cricketers from Pretoria
South African emigrants to New Zealand